Special Report with Bret Baier (formerly Special Report with Brit Hume) is an American television news and political commentary program, hosted by Bret Baier since 2009, that airs on Fox News Channel. It is broadcast live each Monday through Friday at 6:00 p.m. ET. The program focuses on both reporting and analysis of the day's events, with a primary focus on national American political news. The show has been a part of the Fox News program lineup since 1998 and is the number one cable news broadcast in its time slot.

Format
The program reports on the day's events, usually focusing on political stories out of the nation's capitol, particularly on the President, Congress, and the Supreme Court.

A typical show begins with news stories featuring various Fox News correspondents, followed by an interview conducted by Baier with political newsmakers or pundits. After the halfway point in the program, and after a short break for current headlines, Baier presents a segment referred to as "the Political Grapevine" — a collection of short items, sometimes humorous, about  minor political happenings. Baier sometimes uses this segment to point out oddities in coverage of a story by competing news media. (In the early days of the Iraq War, this segment was referred to by Brit Hume as "the Wartime Grapevine.")

The best-known part of Special Report is Baier's discussion with "The Fox All-Stars", a two-segment roundtable with a panel of three political reporters and columnists.

The program ends with a comedic clip, known as "the kicker", usually taken from the preceding night's shows by David Letterman, Jay Leno, Jimmy Kimmel, or sometimes Saturday Night Live. Brit Hume would usually sign off with, "That's Special Report for this time, please tune us in next time, and in the meantime, more news is on the way — fair, balanced and unafraid." When Bret Baier became host, he signed off with, "Your source for news, tonight and every night," which he later changed to, "Straightforward news in uncertain times." As of September 2020, Baier uses Hume's classic "fair, balanced and unafraid" sign-off.

Fill in hosts for Baier include Mike Emanuel, Shannon Bream, Trace Gallagher, John Roberts, Gillian Turner and Bill Hemmer.

"Fox All-Star" Panel members
 Brit Hume - Fox News senior political analyst
 Susan Page - Washington bureau chief for USA Today
 Ben Domenech - Fox News contributor, editor at large of The Spectator
 Mara Liasson - NPR national political correspondent
 Juan Williams - Fox News senior political analyst 
 Charles Lane - Washington Post Staff Writer
 Trey Gowdy - Former South Carolina Congressman, host of Sunday Night in America w/Trey Gowdy
 Katie Pavlich - Fox News contributor, editor at Townhall 
 Harold Ford Jr. - Former Tennessee Congressman, co-host of The Five
 Shannon Bream - Host of Fox News Sunday
 Howard Kurtz - Host of Media Buzz
 Kimberly Strassel - Wall Street Journal columnist
 Jason L. Riley - Wall Street Journal writer 
 Morgan Ortagus - Former Department of State spokesperson 
 Guy Benson - host of The Guy Benson Radio Show
 Mollie Hemingway - Senior editor of The Federalist
 Byron York - chief political correspondent for the Washington Examiner
 Gillian Turner - Fox News Washington correspondent 
 Charles Hurt - Washington Times writer
 Jennifer Griffin -  Fox News Chief national security correspondent
 Jessica Tarlov - Democratic strategist, co-host of The Five
 Hugh Hewitt - Radio talk show host 
 Leslie Marshall -   Fox News contributor, radio talk show host
 Josh Kraushaar - senior political correspondent for Axios
 Charles Krauthammer - (In Memoriam) Washington Post political columnist (1998—2018)

Program origins & changes/announcements
The show originated in 1996 and was originally hosted by Brit Hume, who was, at the time, Washington, D.C. managing editor for the network. Hume hosted the program through December 23, 2008, when he hosted his final show before officially stepping down as anchor. The last fifteen minutes of Hume's final program served as a tribute to Hume, including kind words from former President George H. W. Bush, then-President George W. Bush, then-Vice President Dick Cheney, and then-ABC News anchor Charles Gibson, as well as several Fox News reporters, and allowed him some final thoughts. Hume announced Bret Baier, who substituted for Hume on Fridays beginning in fall 2007, would become the full-time host after the holidays, while Hume moved to a new role as senior political analyst for the network. Chris Wallace and Shannon Bream are occasional substitute anchors.

Brit Hume hosted the show from its debut in 1996 until his retirement in December 2008. He has since appeared on the program as a panelist commentator.

On June 15, 2009, the show launched in high definition with new music and graphics.

From its inception, Special Report has broadcast live from the network's Capitol Hill studio in Washington. However, on some occasions, such as the night of a significant election, the program will broadcast from the network's New York studios.

The program is among the top five of all ad-supported news shows on cable, and draws more than two million viewers per evening.

On January 13, 2020, the show launched new graphics and a new logo.

References

External links

The Daily Bret on FoxNews.com
About Special Report with Bret Baier on FoxNews.com
 
 Fox News Live Stream

 
 

Fox News original programming
1998 American television series debuts
1990s American television talk shows
2000s American television talk shows
2010s American television talk shows
2020s American television talk shows
1990s American television news shows
2000s American television news shows
2010s American television news shows
2020s American television news shows
English-language television shows